David Drovdal (born March 29, 1945) is an American politician from the state of North Dakota. A member of the Republican Party, Drovdal represents District 39 in the North Dakota House of Representatives.

Drovdal was elected to the North Dakota House in 1992. He was elected as Speaker following the 2010 elections, and served in the role through 2012.

References

External links

 

1945 births
Living people
Minot State University alumni
Republican Party members of the North Dakota House of Representatives
People from McKenzie County, North Dakota
Politicians from Portland, Oregon
Speakers of the North Dakota House of Representatives
21st-century American politicians